The 2022–23 FC Zbrojovka Brno season is the club's 26th season in the Czech First League. The team is competing in Czech First League and the Czech Cup.

First team squad

Out on loan

Transfers

In

Out

Friendly matches

Pre-season

Mid-season

Competitions

Overview

Czech First League

Results summary

Results by round

League table

Results

Czech Cup

Results

Squad statistics

Appearances and goals

|-
! colspan=16 style=background:#dcdcdc; text-align:center| Goalkeepers

|-
! colspan=16 style=background:#dcdcdc; text-align:center| Defenders

|-
! colspan=16 style=background:#dcdcdc; text-align:center| Midfielders

|-
! colspan=16 style=background:#dcdcdc; text-align:center| Forwards

|-
! colspan=16 style=background:#dcdcdc; text-align:center| Players transferred/loaned out during the season

Notes

Goal Scorers
{| class="wikitable sortable" style="text-align:center;"
|-
! Place
! Pos.
! Name
! Fortuna liga
! Czech Cup
! style="width:85px" | Total
|-
|rowspan="1"|1 ||FW|| align="left" |  Jakub Řezníček||16||2||18
|-
|rowspan="1"|2 ||MF|| align="left" |  Michal Ševčík||8||1||9
|-
|rowspan="3"|3 ||MF|| align="left" |  Jiří Texl||1||1||2
|-
||MF|| align="left" |  Wale Musa Alli||1||1||2
|-
||FW|| align="left" |  Jakub Přichystal||1||1||2
|-
|rowspan="9"|6 ||MF|| align="left" |  Adam Fousek||1||0||1
|-
||DF|| align="left" |  Jakub Šural||1||0||1
|-
||MF|| align="left" |  Ondřej Pachlopník||1||0||1
|-
||MF|| align="left" |  Filip Souček||1||0||1
|-
||DF|| align="left" |  Róbert Matejov||1||0||1
|-
||MF|| align="left" |  Filip Blecha||0||1||1
|-
||MF|| align="left" |  Jakub Nečas||0||1||1
|-
||FW|| align="left" |  Lukáš Rogožan||0||1||1
|-
||DF|| align="left" |  Josef Divíšek||0||1||1
|- class="sortbottom"
| colspan="3" | Own goals
| 1
| 0
| 1
|-
! colspan="3"|TOTAL
! |33||10||43
|-

Notes

Assists
{| class="wikitable sortable" style="text-align:center;"
|-
! Place
! Pos.
! Name
! Fortuna liga
! Czech Cup
! style="width:85px" | Total
|-
|rowspan="1"|1 ||MF|| align="left" |  Michal Ševčík||5||3||8
|-
|rowspan="1"|2 ||MF|| align="left" |  Wale Musa Alli||5||1||6
|-
|rowspan="3"|3 ||FW|| align="left" |  Jakub Řezníček||3||0||3
|-
||MF|| align="left" |  Adam Fousek||2||1||3
|-
||MF|| align="left" |  Šimon Falta||1||2||3
|-
|rowspan="4"|6 ||FW|| align="left" |  Jan Hladík||2||0||2
|-
||MF|| align="left" |  Jiří Texl||2||0||2
|-
||DF|| align="left" |  Denis Granečný||1||1||2
|-
||DF|| align="left" |  Matěj Hrabina||1||1||2
|-
|rowspan="2"|10||MF|| align="left" |  Filip Souček||1||0||1
|-
||FW|| align="left" |  Lukáš Rogožan||0||1||1
|- class="sortbottom"
|-
! colspan="3"|TOTAL
! |23||10||33
|-

Notes

Clean sheets
{| class="wikitable sortable" style="text-align:center;"
|-
! Place
! Pos.
! Name
! Fortuna liga
! Czech Cup
! style="width:85px" | Total
|-
|rowspan="1"|1 ||GK|| align="left" |  Martin Berkovec||3||0||3
|-
|rowspan="1"|2 ||GK|| align="left" |  Jakub Šiman||0||1||1
|-
|rowspan="1"|3 ||GK|| align="left" |  Vlastimil Hrubý||0||0||0
|-
! colspan="3"|TOTAL
! |3||1||4
|-

Notes

Disciplinary record
{| class="wikitable" style="font-size: 100%; text-align: center;"
|-
|rowspan="2" width="10%" align="center"|Number
|rowspan="2" width="10%" align="center"|Nation
|rowspan="2" width="10%" align="center"|Position
|rowspan="2" width="20%" align="center"|Name
|colspan="2" align="center"|Fortuna Liga
|colspan="2" align="center"|Czech Cup
|colspan="2" align="center"|Total
|-
!width=60 style="background: #FFEE99"|
!width=60 style="background: #FF8888"|
!width=60 style="background: #FFEE99"|
!width=60 style="background: #FF8888"|
!width=60 style="background: #FFEE99"|
!width=60 style="background: #FF8888"|
|-
|16 ||||MF||Jan Sedlák||8||0||1||0||9||0
|-
|24 ||||DF||Peter Štepanovský||6||1||1||0||7||1
|-
|4 ||||DF||Jan Hlavica||5||0||1||0||6||0
|-
|11 ||||MF||Adam Fousek||5||0||0||0||5||0
|-
|10 ||||MF||Antonín Růsek||4||1||0||0||4||1
|-
|66 ||||MF||Marek Vintr||3||0||1||0||4||0
|-
|21 ||||MF||Ondřej Pachlopník||4||0||0||0||4||0
|-
|24 ||||MF||Adrián Čermák||4||0||0||0||4||0
|-
|6 ||||DF||Pavel Dreksa||4||0||0||0||4||0
|-
|3 ||||DF||Jakub Šural||3||0||0||0||3||0
|-
|26 ||||DF||Timotej Záhumenský||3||0||0||0||3||0
|-
|14 ||||FW||Jakub Přichystal||2||0||0||0||2||0
|-
|27 ||||DF||Damián Bariš||2||0||0||0||2||0
|-
|8 ||||MF||Šimon Šumbera||2||0||0||0||2||0
|-
|90 ||||MF||Ondřej Vaněk||2||0||0||0||2||0
|-
|44 ||||DF||Luděk Pernica||2||0||0||0||2||0
|-
|17 ||||DF||Jan Moravec||2||0||0||0||2||0
|-
|20 ||||FW||Jan Hladík||2||0||0||0||2||0
|-
|3 ||||DF||Jakub Černín||1||0||0||0||1||0
|-
|15 ||||DF||Zoran Gajić||1||0||0||0||1||0
|-
|5 ||||MF||David Jambor||1||0||0||0||1||0
|-
|9 ||||MF||Daniel Fila||1||0||0||0||1||0
|-
|18 ||||MF||Jan Koudelka||0||0||1||0||1||0
|-
|colspan="14"|Players away on loan:
|-
|colspan="14"|Players who left Zbrojovka during the season:
|-
|colspan="3"|
|TOTALS
|67
|2
|5
|0
|72
|2
|-

Notes

References

External links
Official website

FC Zbrojovka Brno seasons
Zbrojovka Brno